HD 106112, also known as CO Camelopardalis, is a star in the constellation Camelopardalis. It has an apparent magnitude of about 5.1, meaning that it is just barely visible to the naked eye. Based upon parallax measurements made by the Hipparcos spacecraft, this star is around 177 light years away from the Sun.

HD 106112's spectral type shows that it is an A-type giant star. HD 106112 is also an Am star, also known as a metallic-line star. These types of stars have spectra indicating varying amounts of metals, like iron.

Observations of the stars spectrum reveal a periodic Doppler shift. This means that HD 106112 is a spectroscopic binary with a period of 1.271 days and an eccentricity of 0.01. In fact, the two stars orbit so closely that they distort each other into an ellipsoidal shape through gravity, thereby forming a rotating ellipsoidal variable system. However, almost no information is known about the companion star.

References

A-type main-sequence stars
Camelopardalis (constellation)
106112
4646
Rotating ellipsoidal variables
Camelopardalis, CO
059504
BD+78 0412
Spectroscopic binaries